Fred Gerlach (August 26, 1925 – December 31, 2009) was an American folk musician and luthier. Led Zeppelin guitarist Jimmy Page credited his recording of the traditional song "Gallows Pole" with inspiring his own band's version.

Career
In the early 1950s he sang in the Jewish Young Folksingers chorus conducted by Robert De Cormier. Gerlach was among the first folk artists to adopt the 12 string guitar as his medium. A friend of fellow folk musicians Ramblin' Jack Elliott, Woody Guthrie and Pete Seeger, his first album was even called Twelve-String Guitar.  Its flagship song, "Gallows Pole", was heard and covered by Led Zeppelin guitarist Jimmy Page, saying:

I first heard it ('Gallows Pole') on an old Folkways LP by Fred Gerlach, a 12-string player who was, I believe, the first white to play the instrument. I used his version as a basis and completely changed the arrangement

Gerlach was inspired to adopt the 12 string by his mentor and one-time roommate Lead Belly, a blues guitarist famous for using the instrument.  At the time Gerlach became interested in the instrument, it was almost unknown. He later related:

I went into one of the largest musical instrument stores in the country, and the manager assured me that no such instrument existed. On another occasion a maker of fine 12-string lutes (nylon strings) pictured for me a nightmare of explosive force required to hold twelve steel strings in proper tension. He envisioned bits of guitar and guitarist flying asunder. I have combed New York City pawnshops and music stores and have received a variety of comments ranging' from 'Sorry, we're out of them now. Won't a six-string guitar do? to 'Have you got rocks in your head, buddy?' In fact, it took me about a year after I had first decided to play a twelve-string before I found one. It wasn't a concentrated search, but it nevertheless indicates the general unavailability of the instrument.

Because of the difficulty in finding 12 string guitars, Gerlach began to make his own, for himself and his peers. Pete Seeger, Leo Kottke, Dick Rosmini, and other name-brand folk musicians came to use his instruments.

Discography

Albums
 Twelve-String Guitar (1962)
 Songs My Mother Never Sang (1968)
 Easy Rider

Compilations
 The Twelve-String Story Vol. 1 (1963)
 The Twelve-String Story Vol. 2 (1963)
 The Guitar Greats
 Golden Guitars
 Takoma Eclectic Sampler Vol 2 (1999)
 Imaginational Anthem Vol. 2

See also
 12 string guitar
 Lead Belly
 Gallows Pole

References

1925 births
2009 deaths
American folk guitarists
American male guitarists
American folk singers
American people of German-Jewish descent
American Ashkenazi Jews
Jewish American musicians
Jewish folk singers
20th-century American guitarists
20th-century American singers
20th-century American male musicians
20th-century American Jews
21st-century American Jews